Nieuw Amsterdam may refer to one of the following ships of the Holland America Line:

 , an ocean liner in service 1905–1931
 , an ocean liner in service 1938–1974
 , a cruise ship in service 1984–2000
 , a cruise ship which entered service in 2010

Ship names

pl:SS Nieuw Amsterdam